Lawrence Bolton (born 27 September 1990), better known by the stage name Tia Kofi, is a British drag queen from Clapham, South London. They are best known for competing on the second series of RuPaul's Drag Race UK.

Career 
Tia Kofi began their career as a drag queen in 2014, when they started drag on the same day and at the same venue as series 1 contestant Sum Ting Wong. Their name is a play on the phrase "tea or coffee?", and as part of their initial entrance confessional, Tia Kofi joked that they'd named himself after Tia Mowry from American sitcom Sister Sister and former Secretary-General of the United Nations, Kofi Annan. Prior to competing on the second series of RuPaul's Drag Race UK, Kofi frequently performed in venues across South London, predominantly in Clapham.

Kofi is a part of a drag girl-group called The Vixens consisting of Kofi, Pixie Polite and Woe Addams.

In December 2020, Tia Kofi was announced as one of twelve contestants competing on the second series of RuPaul's Drag Race UK. After lip synching three times, Tia Kofi ultimately placed seventh overall.

In February 2021, shortly after their elimination from Drag Race, Tia Kofi released their debut single "Outside In" (co-written by Little Boots, Tom Aspaul and Gil Lewis), as well as a music video on 24 February 2021. In May 2021, Tia Kofi performed alongside series 1 winner The Vivienne, and fellow series 2 contestant Veronica Green at the Vaudeville Theatre in "Drag Queens of Pop", which was one of the first performances on the West End after the third national COVID-19 lockdown in England.

In February 2022, Tia Kofi embarked on RuPaul's Drag Race UK: The Official Tour alongside the entire cast of series 2, in association with World of Wonder and promoter Voss Events. Their set consisted of "Outside In" followed by "Don't Start Now" by Dua Lipa and "No Way" from the musical Six.

Personal life 
Tia Kofi identifies as queer. They are the drag mother of Victoria Scone. Kofi uses they/she pronouns.

Filmography

Film

Television

Music videos

Discography

Extended plays

Singles

As featured artist

Stage

References

External links 
 
 

1990 births
Living people
20th-century LGBT people
21st-century LGBT people
English drag queens
Gay entertainers
RuPaul's Drag Race UK contestants